Giorgio Lapazaya (1495 in Monopoli  1570) was an Italian mathematician and musician.

Biography
He was the son of Danush and Maruccia whom arrived in Monopoli from Durrës after the fall of Constantinople to the Turks (1453). He achieved the title of sub-diaconate in 1508, and was a Canonical of the Cathedral of Monopoli from 1533. In the following years he was given the office of Prothonotary apostolic by Pope Pius IV. He was trained culturally in the quadrivium, and in 1532 has compiled an Antiphonary (of processional type) where, in addition to well-known songs from the Gregorian repertoire, he put some his short compositions monophonic closely linked to the cult practiced in the Renaissance in Monopoli. This was discovered in the late 1970s and published by eminent musicologist Domenico Morgante in various studies since 1981. This precious parchment is the oldest Italo-Albanian music source and testifies to the existence of a profitable cultural "contamination" between the two sides of the Adriatic Sea.

In 1542 he edited, at the publisher Sultzbach in Naples, an important treatise on Arithmetic and Geometry which was reprinted almost without interruption until the late Eighteenth century (1566, 1569, 1575, 1590, 1601, 1723, 1727, 1784). The presence of his family, owner of jus patronatus in the ancient Church of St. Peter, is documented in Monopoli at least until the first half of the Eighteenth century. His original surname in Albanian (Lapazaya) appears, both in handwritten documents in the archive, both in printed works, in a rich variety of forms: Lapizzaya, Lapizzaglia, Lapizzaga, Lapezzaja, etc.

The City of Monopoli has dedicated him a street not far from the cathedral, and his marble bust stands in the entrance to the Council Chamber of the City of Durrës.

References
Antifonario (1532); Monopoli, Archivio Unico Diocesano.
Selva d'Oro del Cirullo monopolitano (sec. XVII), ivi.
D. Morgante, La Cappella musicale del Duomo di Monopoli nel Rinascimento: l'Antifonario del 1532, la prassi esecutiva, i documenti inediti su Jachet de Berchem, in “Monumenta Apuliae ac Japygiae”, I (1981), pp. 27–34.
G. Luisi, Giorgio Lapazzaja, matematico monopolitano del Cinquecento, in “Monopoli nell'Età del Rinascimento”, Atti del Convegno Internazionale di Studio (1985), vol. III, Città di Monopoli, Biblioteca Comunale “P. Rendella”, 1988, pp. 1045–1063.
D. Morgante, La Musica in Puglia tra Rinascite e Rivoluzioni, prefazione di Giorgio Pestelli, Bari, Fondazione “N. Piccinni”, 1991.
D. Morgante, L'Abate albanese venuto a Monopoli - Storia e analisi dell'Antifonario cinquecentesco di Giorgio Lapazaya, in "Pentagramma", IV (1/1992), pp. 9–10.
D. Morgante, Una fonte musicale italo-albanese del primo Cinquecento: l'Antifonario dell'Abate Lapazaya nell'Archivio Diocesano di Monopoli, in “Atti del Congresso Internazionale sulle relazioni tra Italia e Albania (Ancona-Fabriano-Senigallia, 30 gennaio - 1º febbraio 1992)”, Bari, Editrice Tipografica, 1994, pp. 149–171.
D. Morgante, Monopoli nella Storia della Musica - Il Cinquecento, in AA. VV., Monopoli ieri, oggi e domani, Fasano, Schena, 1995, pp. 23–33.
D. Morgante, Presenze Albanesi a Monopoli dal XV secolo e loro ruolo nella Storia della Cultura Mediterranea, testo della relazione letta al Convegno “La Giornata dell'Amicizia tra Monopoli e Berati”, Monopoli 1995.
D. Morgante, Prania e shqiptarëvë në Monopoli nga shekulli XV dhe roli i tyre në historinë e kulturës mesdhetae, in “Riljndia”, e përditshme informative e pavarur, Tiranë, ë martë 27 qershor 1995.
D. Morgante, Sande Necòle va pe màre, in "Puglia in Tavola-Tradizione e Cultura", I (n. 5/6, 2002), pp. 110–111.
Flora Gjondedaj Dervishi, Mes Kryemesharit dhe Antifonarit. A nuk i detyrohet Muzikologjia, cultura shqiptare, professor Domeniko Morgantes, për Antifonarin e durrsakut Gjergj Danush Lapacaj, të vitit 1532??, in “Bulevard”, 2 Korrik 2013, VIII (653), pp. 10 e sgg.
D. Morgante, Il Codice di Giorgio Lapazaya (1532), un “connubio” musicale tra Italia e Albania nel primo Cinquecento, testo della Lectio Magistralis svolta nell’ambito della Biennale Musica di Durazzo (1-7 agosto 2013), Istituto Mediterraneo di Musicologia, 2013.

1490s births
1570s deaths
People from Bari
16th-century Italian mathematicians